Johannisburg may refer to:
 Johannisburg, formerly in East Prussia, now named Pisz, in Poland
 Schloss Johannisburg (Castle Johannisburg), in Germany
 Johannisburg Township, Washington County, Illinois, USA

See also 
 Johannisberg (disambiguation)
 Johannesberg (disambiguation)
 Johannesburg (disambiguation)